The Affiliated New Thought Network, or ANTN, based in La Mesa, California, is an organization of New Thought centers and individuals across the United States and internationally that was founded in 1992. Recognized as a cooperative fellowship, it is an intrafaith organization. Originally for independent Religious Science ministers, today it includes all forms of New Thought organizations and individuals who want to be affiliated.

Governance 

The organization has a president, vice-president, secretary, treasurer, educational liaison, and general members. Each member is allowed to vote within the organization, as long as they uphold New Thought ideals and beliefs.

Activities 

One primary tool of ANTN is affirmative prayer. In addition to teaching about New Thought, the ANTN and its members provide support for a number of organizations committed to nonviolence.

Emerson Theological Institute 

The Emerson Theological Institute is partnered with ANTN to provide Religious Studies degrees including bachelors, masters, and doctorates, and certificates for ministers. The Institute is accredited by the Accrediting Commission International for Schools, Colleges and Theological Seminaries. Barbara Marx Hubbard developed her popular "Gateway for Conscious Evolution" while creating a curriculum for the Institute.

References

External links 
 ANTN official website.

Religious organizations established in 1992
New Thought organizations
Religious Science
Organizations based in California
1992 establishments in California